Der Sohn der Teriel (French: Le Fils de l'Ogresse; English: The Son of the Ogress) is a Berber folktale, first collected in Kabylia in German by ethnologist Leo Frobenius and published in 1922.

Scholars relate the tale to the international theme of the Animal as Bridegroom or The Search for the Lost Husband, and recognize similarities to the Graeco-Roman myth of Cupid and Psyche.

Summary
A father is set to leave on voyage, but asks his four daughters what presents he can give them when he returns. The three elders say they want beautiful dresses, while the youngest asks for a peculiar present: a pigeon  that dances alone in a meadow.

The father finds the dresses in the trip, but still haven't found the pigeon, nor has found anyone who could give him information about it. After he reaches the border of a forest and sees the little bird. He tries to jump onto it to capture it, but a mysterious booming voice orders him to stop his action. The father tries to explain that the bird is a gift for his daughter, and even offers to buy it, but the voice - that belongs to a person named Asphor'ulehóa, the son of a teriel - refuses. Asphor'ulehóa relents and lets the man take the bird, and makes him promise to give him his youngest daughter for wife. The man knows that a teriel is a flesh-eater creature and fear for his daughter's life, but Asphor'ulehóa assures not harm shall be done to her, and tells him that he will come to their house in the shape of a camel.

The man returns and gives them the presents. When he is on his deathbed, he tells them that a camel shall appear. Some time later, the camel appears at their door. Every one of the four daughters climbs onto it, but it does not move. Only after the fourth daughter climbs onto it with the pigeon does the animal move and takes the girl to another place, already furnished. The girl notices someone comes to her bedroom every night and says she must not light any lamp.

Some time later, her sister visit her, and she tells them she has lived a comfortable life, but she has never seen the true face of Asphor'ulehóa. Her sisters convince her to spy on him when he comes at night. That night, she lights a candle and conceals it with a pot lid. Her husband comes to bed and falls asleep. She takes ofd the pot lid and raises her torch at him: Asphor'ulehóa is a beautiful youth. She also notices some little angels ("malaika", in the original) near his body. The little angels tell her they are weaving a dress for Asphor'ulehóa's wife. Asphor'ulehóa wakes up with a startle and admonishes his wife for breaking his trust. He takes his garments and leaves in a hurry.

The girl follows after him, who hurries his steps towards his mother's house. When he arrives there, his human wife reaches him. Asphor'ulehóa tells her the place belongs to his mother, a teriel, who may devour her. So he lets her climb a nearby palm tree and tells her so stay there until his mother promises on his name not to do her any harm.

Asphor'ulehóa enters the house and his mother, the teriel, greets him. She says she will fetch some water to drink in a nearby fountain. She goes outside with a jar and sees the reflection of the girl in the water. Thinking there is a person in the water, she reaches into the reflected image to take it and devour it. She fails and breaks the jar. She goes home to get another jug and to try getting the girl she sees in the image. After some tries, she notices the girl on the tree and tries to convince her to climb down. The girl tells her she must first promise on her son's name not to harm her.

Asphor'ulehóa introduces the girl as his human wife. The next day, the teriel orders her to clean their wide courtyard as soon as she leaves, and not to leave any speckle of dust, otherwise she will devour her. The girl tells her husband about it; Asphor'ulehóa knocks on a rock to summon a large flood of water to clean up the courtyard in no time.

The next morning, the teriel mother orders her daughter-in-law to fill a cushion/pillow with feathers of all birds by nightfall. Asphor'ulehóa tells the girl to go up the hill and shout into the air that Asphor'ulehóa is sick and needs a pillow/cushion, and the birds shall appear to give her their feathers. The third task is for the girl to return every single feather to their original owner. Asphor'ulehóa tells her to go to the same hill, summon the birds, thank them for their help and return their feathers.

The next task is for her to separate water from milk that the teriel has mixed up. Asphor'ulehóa says they can't do it and admits his teriel mother has tried to kill her the past few days. That night, the teriel returns home and sees that the task was not done. Asphor'ulehóa tricks his mother to invite her sister for a feast with the girl as the main dish, but he hides his wife and roasts a bull. He opens up a pit in the dining room, fills it with fat and embers, and closes it with soil. He invites his mother and aunts to the dining room and directs them to stay on that spot. He reminds his mother of her oath and intends to enforce it: he commands the ground to open up and swallow the teriel and his aunts, who are consumed in the fire.

Asphor'ulehóa and his human wife leave the place forever and return to her father's house.

Analysis

Tale type
Scholarship classifies the tale in the Aarne-Thompson-Uther Index as type ATU 425, "The Search for the Lost Husband", and relate it to the ancient Graeco-Roman myth of Cupid and Psyche, as written down by author Apuleius in the 2th century CE.

Motifs
The teriel (tzeriel) is described as a monster in Kabylian folklore. She appears to be the female counterpart of the Warzen, another creature, and both populate the Kabylian folktale corpus as antagonists. In Western (French) works, she may be translated as ogresse or ogress.

German philologist Otto Weinreich compared the heroine's tasks in the tale to Psyche's in the Graeco-Roman myth: just like Psyche is given 4 tasks by her mother-in-law, Venus, the heroine of the Berber tale is given four tasks (three she accomplishes, and one - to separate water from milk - she fails).

Swedish scholar  remarked that, in tales of "The Search for the Lost Husband" type, the task of sorting seeds or grains occurs in Mediterranean and Near Eastern variants of type ATU 425B, "The  Witch's Tasks". In this regard, linguist and Berberologist Henri Basset believed in the antiquity of the motifs of the grain-sorting and the ants as the heroine's helpers in Berber tradition.

Variants
Commenting on an Italian translation of the tale (titled Lo sposo invisibile, or "The Invisible Husband"), professor Annamaria Zesi claims that the story is "diffusa" ("spread") in Kabyle among the Berbers.

Scholarship locates at least 4 more variants in Kabylia: Gold Bud, The Bird of the Air and two homonymous tales titled The Bird of the Storm. Another version, titled Son of the Ogress, was collected from the Sefrou region, in Morocco, and another titled The Story of Seffar Ihwa (Arabic: Seffar Ihwa, 'whistling of the wind'), from Bezzazi.

Kabylia
In Azejjig Ireqqen, Bourgeon d'Or or Gold Bud, a father receives a present from a magical being, and a voice tells him to give up his youngest daughter in marriage to him. His youngest daughter, Tiziri ("Moonlight") is given to the male voice as his bride. Tiziri is carried by a giant bird (her husband in avian disguise) to their joint house. They marry and he sets a prohibition on her: she must not light any lamp at night on the bridal chambers. One night, she disobeys him and lights a torch. Her husband, Gold Bud, admonishes her, turns back into a giant bird and vanishes, back to his mother's house. In his rage at her betrayal, a great storm rages on for seven days and nights. After this period, Tiziri follows after him and passes by three shepherds, one grazing a herd of bulls, the second a herd of mares, and the third a herd of sheep and goats. Tiziri asks the shepherds whom the herds belong to, and they all say the animals would have belonged to Tiziri, had she been patient. She then passes by natural features that lead the way: a dried fountain and a normal one; a dead ash tree and a lush one. Finally, she reaches the house of a Teriel, her mother-in-law, who imposes tasks on the human girl: first, she is to clean the patio and the floor. Her husband advises her to lift a stone, and a stream of water will fulfill the task for her. Next, the Teriel orders her to sort a heap of mixed seeds, which a colony of ants fulfills for her. Thirdly, she is to collect feathers from all birds in five sacks; her husband asks her to shout at all the birds that their king is naked, so they will come to offer their feathers. Later, the Teriel orders her to return their feathers; Tiziri is advised to summon the birds again and tell them their king is clothed. Lastly, the Teriel, enraged, says she will let her ogress daughter devour her. Gold Bud appears in person to Tiziri and tells her to give some lamb legs to his sisters, and they make thei way across the air.

Professors Óscar Abenójar, Ouahiba Immoune and Fatima-Zohra Menas collected another Kabylian tale from a 90-year-old teller from Great Kabylia. In this tale, titled La princesa cautiva y el pájaro del viento ("The captive princess and the bird of the wind"), a sultan's daughter spends her days trapped at home. One day, while she is standing on a balcony, the bird of the wind flies in and steals her belongings, despite her trying to stop it: first, her veil, then a pin, a bracelet and a fu'a, among other things. The bird then vanishes. Some time later, the sultan's daughter asks her maidservant to fetch her water. On her way there, she finds some feathers on the ground, and sees some camels walking by the seashore. She grabs a camel by its tail and follows it, until it reaches a stable. The maidservant hides between the oxen and other animals, and watches as slaves come, have a meal then sleep, and the bird of the wind flies in to the stables and sing a song about the maiden locked in her room, as the animals cry with him. The bird then flies away. The maidservant leaves and rushes back to her mistress's palace to tell the other servants about the wondrous events she witnessed. The maiden in the room overhears it and, fueled by a sudden resolution, declares she will leave home and accompany the maidservant to the place where she was the other night. The duo follow the camels to the same stable and hide behind the animals; the bird of the wind flies in soon after and sings his sad song, but the animals begin to laugh, since the maiden the bird sings about is there with them. The maiden comes out of hiding and the bird notices she is there, then flies away. The maiden decides to rush after him: she passes by two trees (one lush and green and other dried); two fountains (one dried and other full of water); two tents where they sell silk (one full of customers and the other empty); two windmills (one milling the grain and the other not), and lastly by two cafés (one full of people and the other empty). She follows his trail and ends up at the café door. The bird of the wind comes out of the café tent, grabs the maiden and takes her to his house. They land, and the bird warns the maiden his mother is a cannibal ogress, but leaves her under his mother's care. The ogress, however, plans to eat the maiden, and sets her on hard tasks: first, to get bird feathers to fill a mattress for her, then clean all the feathers from the house (done by summoning all the birds); next, to sort out a mixed heap of grains (done by summoning ants), and sweep the patios (the bird of the wind commands the rivers to wash away the hay). The bird of the wind, then, tricks his mother to fatten the maiden and invite her ogress sisters to devour her, while he plots with the maiden. The ogress mother falls for her son's plan and gives food to the maiden and, after the latter seems plump enough, invites her sisters to feast on the human. The maiden offers to dance before the ogresses to distract them. After her dance, she smears their hair with gas and throws a firestarter at them. While the ogresses catch on fire, the bird of the wind takes the girl away with him through the air.

Morocco
In a Moroccan tale titled Le Cheval Persan, collected by Dr. Françoise Légey from teller Jema'a, slave to Sultan Moulay-Ḥasan, a king has a daughter and a "cheval persan" (Persian horse). The princess regularly feeds the horse with a bucket of milk and some almonds. The horse - actually, a Roûḥânî (translated as "spirit") - tells the king he wants to marry the princess. The king overhears him and consents. Some time later, when the princess goes to feed it, she sees spectacular and extravagant wedding gifts. The king marries his daughter to the horse, but the queen, her mother, expresses her distaste to such a marriage. The horse takes off the equine skin and becomes a handsome youth. The queen approaches her daughter and tells her plan: a slave will come to wedding chambers, take the skin and burn it. However, the youth wears the skin again and escapes. The princess tries to follow him, but loses his track. She reaches a salt mine and sees a herd of donkeys carrying loads of salt. She inquires about their destination: the castle of the Persian horse, because he has married earlier. The princess reaches her husband's castle and her husband explains his mother, his sisters and his aunts are all "Ghoûles" (man-eating creatures). He advises her to suckle on his mother's breasts in order to earn her favour. She does that and the mother-in-law begrudgingly accepts her. Soon, she forces her to cover the walls of a room with bird feathers. Her husband, under an avian disguise, commands all birds to fulfill the task. Next, the Ghoûle mother gives the human princess two nuts and sends her to her Ghoûle sisters. On the road, the princess opens the two nuts and an orchestra of musicians escape from  the nuts. Her husband, still under the avian disguise, summons the musicians back into the two nuts, and tells his wife that this task is a trap; she is to go to his aunts' house, throw the nuts at them and flee. Finally, the Ghoûle mother summons all Ghoûles for her son's wedding and places an oil lamp on the princess's hands, telling her that, as soon as the wick is out, the princess will be devoured. Again, on her husband's instructions, the princess takes the hairs of one of the Ghoûles to replace the wick. The hairs catch on fire and burn the Ghoûles. Cheval persan takes the princess back to her father's kingdom.

In another Moroccan tale collected by Dr. Légey from Jema'a with the title Moulay Ḥammam, la Jeune Fille et les Ghoûles ("Moulay Hammam, the Maiden and the Man-Eaters"), a man has to go to Mecca on pilgrimage, but before he leaves he asks his seven daughters what he can bring them as gifts. The seventh daughter asks him to deliver her letter to "Moulay Ḥammam ou 'Imâm", and whispers a command on her father's mule's ear to not let him forget his promise. The man finds gifts for 6 of his daughters, but forgets about the seventh. The mule stops on its tracks, until the man remembers. He tries to find this "Moulay Ḥammam ou 'Imâm", and he talks to three Ghoûles (man-eating creatures). A third Ghoûle takes the letter and gives the man two walnuts, and explains that his daughter is to wash her bedroom, set the bed and toss a walnut into the fire. The man returns home, distributes the presents, and gives the walnuts to his seventh daughter with the instructions. The girl prepares her room and tosses one walnut into the fire.  Moulay Ḥammam ou 'Imâm appears in her room in the shape of a dove and becomes a youth. He brandishes his sword and sticks it in the ground: a retinue of slaves and djinns appear and prepare for them a meal. They eat and talk through the night, until, just before dawn, Moulay Ḥammam turns back into a dove and prepares to leave through the window, but gives the girl a bag of gold. Morning comes, and her sisters and aunts enter her bedroom, see the bag and take it for themselves. This repeats for some time, until a female neighbour asks the girl if her beloved Moulay Ḥammam leaves her some gift. On their next encounter, the girl asks Moulay Hammam about any gift, and he shows her the bag of gold. One day, the girl is invited to the public baths by her sisters, and one of them returns to the girl room and smashes the window. Moulay Hammam flies to the broken window, falls into the broken glass and goes home badly hurt. The girl fears that something must have happened to her beloved, since he fails to appear for the following nights. So she disguises herself as a man and travels the world to find him. She stops by two trees, Kîwâna and Zîwâna, who talk to each other about Moulay Hammam’s injuries and how some of their leaves and branches may cure him. Armed with this new knowledge, she departs to Moulay Hammam’s country and introduces herself as a doctor. Once there, Moulay Hammam suspects the doctor is his wife, and his mother, a Ghoûle, sets up three trials to discover the doctor’s gender: prepare a sheep’s head for a meal (women prefer the tongue, the ears and the eyes), examine the horse’s fodder (yellow alfalfa if the rider is female; green if the rider is male) and to invite her to take a bath in the river. With the horse’s help, the girl avoids being found out. She asks for Moulay Hammam’s ring as a reward and returns to her family. Back home, she tosses the second walnut into the fire and summons her beloved to her room, where she explains the truth. Moulay Hammam takes her to her country, and his mother forces the girl on some tasks. First, she is to clean the house and wash it in a way that each drop of water lies at an equal distance one from the other. Moulay Hammam summons his ‘afrit to accomplish it. Next, she is to separate a heap of cereal grains (corn, wheat, barley, beans, and lentil), which is done by the birds of the world, since Moulay Hammam is their king. The third task is to hold an oil lamp for the whole night to illuminate a session of henna done to Moulay. The girl uses a strand of her own hair as a substitute wick for the oil lamp and cries, her tears falling on his face; her husband awakes, sees that the fire can consume her, and produces another wick to preserve the lamp and spare her. The fourth task is to go to the Ghoûle’s sister (also a man-eating creature) and to get from her a tamis. Moulay advises her to give the correct fodder to a dog and a donkey, to compliment a river of blood; to get a standing beam and lay it down on the ground; to tell a roadblock it is a wide route; and to suckle on his aunt’s breast. She gets the tamis and brings it to Moulay’s mother. Lastly, she forces the girl to hold an oil lamp again, this time on a henna session for the Ghoûle’s daughter-in-law. The girl holds the oil lamp and cries, a tear falling on Moulay’s cheek. He wakes up, takes off the oil lamp and takes his true human wife on his wings back to her kingdom. French scholar  noted that this tale begins with the father's gifts for his daughters, and "ends like the tale of Psyche, with the mother-in-law's tasks".

Palestine
Scholars Ibrahim Muhawi and Sharif Kanaana collected an Arab Palestinian tale titled Jummez bin Yazur, šex it-tyur ("Jummez Bin Yazur, Chief of the Birds"): a merchant has three daughters, the youngest named Sitt il-Husun (“Mistress of Beauty”). One day, he has to go to the hajj, and asks his three daughters what they want when he returns from the hajj. The youngest asks her father to bring her Jummez Bin Yazur, Chief of the Birds, and curses his camels not to returns if he forgets it. He meets a sheikh who directs him to Yazur’s house and a command to summon this person. He stands in front of the house and shouts that his daughter is looking for his son, Jummez Bin Yazur. Some time later, a bird arrives at Sitt il-Husun’s window and turns into a youth. Both converse until dawn, when he becomes a bird and is ready to depart, leaving a purse full of gold for her. The jealous sisters discover their sister’s luck. One day, Sitt il-Husun asks Jummez about what does him harm: pieces of broken glass. The sisters learn of this and break the glass in her window. Jummez flies in bird shape and hurts himself in the broken glass. Time passes, and Sitt il-Husun notices his absence, so she disguises herself as a beggar and tries to look for him. One time, she rests by a tree and overhears the conversation between two doves about how to cure Jummez. Sitt il-Husun kills a dove and mixes its blood and feathers. She reaches Jummez’s house and uses the remedy on him. They recognize each other, and she explains that his injuries were her sisters’ doing. They reconcile, but Jummez's sisters force Sitt il-Husun on some tasks: to sweep and mop the whole town, and to fill ten mattresses for the wedding with enough feathers. On this second task, Jummez advises her to go to the top of the mountain and shout at all the birds that “Jummez Bin Yazur, Chief of the Birds, is dead”, which will summon all the birds to give her their feathers. Lastly, Jummez’s sisters order Sitt il-Husun to get the straw tray hanging on the wall of the ghouleh’s house. Jummez advises Sitt il-Husun that she is to exchange the correct food for animals (meat for lions; barley for horses), to repair a fallen stone terrace of the house, get the tray and flee. Jummez’s sisters consent with his marriage to Sitt il-Husun. Muhawi and Kanaana classified the tale as type ATU 432, "The Prince as Bird", and noted that the tasks by Jummez's sisters parallel Venus's tasks in the myth of Cupid and Psyche.

See also
Graciosa and Percinet
The Green Serpent
The King of Love
Ulv Kongesøn (Prince Wolf)
The Golden Root
The Horse-Devil and the Witch
Tulisa, the Wood-Cutter's Daughter
 Khastakhumar and Bibinagar
 Habrmani
 La Fada Morgana
 Yasmin and the Serpent Prince

Footnotes

References 

African fairy tales
Berber culture
Kabyle people
ATU 400-459